M. R. Ry. Dewan Nanoo Pillai (1827–1886) was a Travancorean statesman who served as the Diwan of Travancore from 1877 to 1880.

Early life 

Nanoo Pillai was born in a Nair family of Neyyoor village of Travancore in 1827. He was educated privately had his English schooling at the London Missionary Society seminary in Nagercoil. While young, he caught the attention of General Cullen, the English Resident. He volunteered to work for the General as a translator and later as a secretary in the Resident's office.

Civil service 

After serving for 14 years in the Resident's office, Nanoo Pillai joined the Travancore service as Assistant Sheristadar. With a strong recommendation from the then Diwan, Sir T. Madhava Rao, Nanoo Pillai was promoted to be Dewan Peishkar of the Southern Division. He was soon transferred to the Travancore division and officiated as the Dewan in Madhava Rao's absence on six occasions and was eventually appointed as the Diwan on the retirement of Seshayya Sastri in August 1877.

As Diwan 

As Diwan of Travancore, Nanoo Pillai brought reforms in the Revenue Settlement introducing the transfer of registries. He also brought measures for irrigating the Southern Division and formulated the Kothayar Project before retiring in 1880.

References

Biographies 

 

1827 births
1886 deaths
Diwans of Travancore